NBA ShootOut 2003 is a video game developed by 989 Sports and published by Sony Computer Entertainment America for the PlayStation and PlayStation 2 in 2002.

Reception

The game received "mixed or average reviews" on both platforms according to the review aggregation website Metacritic.

References

2002 video games
Basketball video games
North America-exclusive video games
PlayStation (console) games
PlayStation 2 games
Video games developed in the United States
Video games set in 2003
Video games set in the United States